Jerry Lorenzo Manuel Jr. (born October 5, 1977) is an American fashion and sneaker designer.  He is the founder of the American streetwear label Fear of God. He is also the son of former MLB player, coach, and manager Jerry Manuel Sr.

Lorenzo created five custom looks for Justin Bieber to wear on stage during his Purpose World Tour. He also helped to design the tour merchandise.  Lorenzo founded his signature label in 2012, although he had no fashion training and was unknown in the world of streetwear.

In 2018, Jerry Lorenzo launched a "competitively priced sister label" to Fear of God, this label was "ESSENTIALS" which was a subsidiary to his main brand, Fear Of God. His Label Essentials has been worn by Kanye West, Justin Bieber
, Gigi Hadid, Selena Gomez, Virgil Abloh and other celebrities.

Early life and career 
Lorenzo was born on October 5, 1977 in Sacramento, California. Lorenzo had a nomadic childhood as his father transitioned roles frequently in MLB: from playing five seasons as a second baseman for the Montreal Expos to managing teams such as the Chicago White Sox and Miami Marlins to coaching for the New York Metropolitans.

Lorenzo went on to get his Bachelor’s at Florida A&M and his MBA at Loyola Marymount. As he was pursuing his MBA, Lorenzo worked part-time in the sales department at Diesel. After college, he began working for the LA Dodgers and a sports marketing agency called CSMG.

In 2008, Lorenzo moved back to LA to throw parties which attracted celebrities and designers of the likes of Virgil Abloh, Pusha-T, and Kid Cudi. In the same year, he began managing MLB player Matt Kemp (Dodgers) with a focus on media image and mens styling. He wanted to style his client in ways that were not available so he decided to design them himself. “I felt like there was something missing in my closet, and if it was missing in mine then it must be missing from yours, too,” he said in an interview with Complex Magazine. Lorenzo decided to change career paths and built Fear of God with only $14,000.

Influences 
Jerry Lorenzo draws heavy influence from a wide range of sources – most notably amongst his contemporaries Kanye West, artists like Kurt Cobain, and athletes like Allen Iverson, to name a few. In fact, Lorenzo took this inspiration and put it into existence when he worked with Justin Bieber to design his purpose tour merchandise. The aesthetics match Cobain’s style closely: graphic t-shirt, denim, and a flannel over shirt.

Lorenzo recalls buying a pair of Rick Owen Dunks in 2006 – the designer was able to transform a basketball sneaker into a luxury item, integrating two very different worlds into one entity. The process of turning basic clothing items luxury is the foundation of Fear of God and what he is pushing with his Essentials sub-line. Though many brands are pushing a similar initiative, Lorenzo's creative direction differs dramatically: he defines luxury as being your own boss and making your own schedule. He even quotes Jay-Z, "Until you’re on your own, you can’t be free no matter how much money you’re making." It is the reason why Fear of God does not do fashion shows. Though he gains influences from designers such as Rick Owens, his creative mission lies is solution wear rather than conceptual design.

Additionally, Lorenzo garners influence from his parents: “We didn’t have a lot when I grew up, but players and coaches looked to my parents for something else they had about themselves that was beyond material things. In a way, it’s what [i'd] like to achieve with Fear of God." Fashion has a greater meaning to him - it goes beyond making clothes as the fashion must be built with purpose. Fear of God is always evolving and is centered around the question: "What [are we] giving to people beyond a cool ‘fit for Instagram?"

As his father was a professional MLB player and general manager, Lorenzo has strong knowledge about baseball and its history. With his seventh collection, he pays homage to the Negro Leagues with pieces that resembled the roles his father held when he managed MLB teams.

Brand and collaborations  
His brand began gaining traction when rapper Big Sean’s stylist got a hold of the t-shirts. They were received well and Lorenzo was asked for more pieces. A few weeks later, Lorenzo receives a call from Kanye West, who asked to see his work on Fear of God so far. A moment of eureka hit Lorenzo when West saw eye-to-eye with his artistic vision. His idol validated his vision and it gave Lorenzo the courage and confidence to continue pushing his creativity.

In 2017, the brand launched a joint collaboration with Vans transforming the Era 95 model with their all over print and transitioned with Nike in 2018 with the signature Air Fear of God 1 silhouette. He moved away from both brands taking the position of Global Head of Adidas Basketball in 2020.

References

American fashion designers
1976 births
Living people